Nissan Rural LLG is a local-level government (LLG) of the Autonomous Region of Bougainville, Papua New Guinea. The LLG administers Nissan Island.

Wards
01. Tungol
02. Sigon
03. Pinepel

References

Local-level governments of the Autonomous Region of Bougainville